Lastreopsis, known as shieldfern, is a genus of ferns in the family Dryopteridaceae, subfamily Elaphoglossoideae, in the Pteridophyte Phylogeny Group classification of 2016 (PPG I).

Species
, the Checklist of Ferns and Lycophytes of the World accepted the following species:

Lastreopsis amplissima (C.Presl) Tindale
Lastreopsis davalliaeformis (Tardieu) Tardieu
Lastreopsis davallioides (Brack.) Tindale
Lastreopsis decomposita (R.Br.) Tindale
Lastreopsis dissecta (C.T.White & Goy) Labiak, Sundue & R.C.Moran
Lastreopsis hispida (Sw.) Tindale
Lastreopsis killipii (C.Chr. & Maxon) Tindale
Lastreopsis marginans (F.Muell.) D.A.Sm. & Tindale ex Tindale
Lastreopsis nephrodioides (Baker) Tindale
Lastreopsis poecilophlebia (Hook.) Labiak, Sundue & R.C.Moran
Lastreopsis silvestris D.A.Sm. ex Tindale
Lastreopsis squamifera (C.Chr.) Lellinger
Lastreopsis subrecedens Ching
Lastreopsis subsericea (Mett.) Tindale
Lastreopsis subsparsa (Alderw.) Tindale
Lastreopsis tenera (R.Br.) Tindale
Lastreopsis tripinnata (F.Muell. ex Benth.) Labiak, Sundue & R.C.Moran
Lastreopsis velutina (A.Rich.) Tindale
Lastreopsis vieillardii (Mett.) Tindale
Lastreopsis walleri Tindale
Lastreopsis wurunuran (Domin) Tindale

References

Dryopteridaceae
Fern genera
Taxonomy articles created by Polbot
Taxa named by Ren-Chang Ching